The Seafarer 29 is an American sailboat that was designed by McCurdy & Rhodes as an International Offshore Rule Half Ton class racer-cruiser and first built in 1972.

Production
The design was built by Seafarer Yachts in the United States, starting in 1972, but it is now out of production.

Design
The Seafarer 29 is a recreational keelboat, built predominantly of solid laminate fiberglass, with wood trim. It was built with two different deck plans: "Standard" and "Futura". It has a masthead sloop rig; a spooned, raked stem; a raised counter, reverse transom, a skeg-mounted rudder controlled by a wheel  and a fixed fin keel or optional centerboard. The fixed keel version displaces  and carries  of ballast, while the centerboard-equipped version displaces  and carries  of ballast.

The design has sleeping accommodation for five people, with a double "V"-berth in the bow cabin, an "U"-shaped settee in the main cabin around a swing table that converts to a double berth and an aft quarter berth on the starboard side. The galley is located on the starboard side just aft of the bow cabin. The galley is equipped with a two-burner stove and a sink. The head is located just aft of the bow cabin on the port side.

The Half Ton class version was a specially configured model.

Operational history
The boat is supported by an active class club that organizes racing events, the Half Ton Class.

See also
List of sailing boat types

References

Keelboats
1970s sailboat type designs
Sailing yachts
Sailboat type designs by McCurdy & Rhodes
Sailboat types built by Seafarer Yachts